The Detroit Turbos were a member of the Major Indoor Lacrosse League from 1989 to 1994. They were based in Detroit, Michigan. Led by Paul and Gary Gait in their first year in the NLL, the Turbos won the 1991 MILL Championship.

Awards & honors

All time Record

Playoff Results

Attendance

Championships

References

Sports teams in Detroit
Lacrosse clubs established in 1989
Lacrosse clubs disestablished in 1994
Lacrosse teams in Michigan
Major Indoor Lacrosse League teams
1989 establishments in Michigan
1994 disestablishments in Michigan
Defunct National Lacrosse League teams